Tinaja  is a term originating in Spain (Spanish for clay jar) and used in the American Southwest for surface pockets (depressions) formed in bedrock that occur below waterfalls, are carved out by spring flow or seepage, or are caused by sand and gravel scouring in intermittent streams (arroyos). Tinajas are an important source of surface water storage in arid environments.  

These relatively rare landforms are important ecologically, because they support unique plant communities and provide important services to terrestrial wildlife.

Examples 
 The Tinajas Altas ("high tinajas") in southern Arizona.
 Several in El Pinacate y Gran Desierto de Altar Biosphere Reserve, Sonora, Mexico.
Las Tinajas de Los Indios, California
Las Tinajas, Zinapécuaro, Mexico

References

External links

Geomorphology
Southwestern United States
Water streams
Fluvial landforms
Habitats
Plant communities of the West Coast of the United States